Christer Majbäck (born 30 January 1964) is a Swedish former cross-country skier who competed at international top level from 1984 to 1999. He won a bronze medal in 10 km at the 1992 Winter Olympics in Albertville.

Majbäck's biggest successes were at the FIS Nordic World Ski Championships where earned five medals, including one gold (4 × 10 km relay: 1989), two silvers (10 km, 4 × 10 km relay: both 1991), and two bronzes (30 km: 1987, 1989).

He also won two World Cup and FIS Races in his career (1989, 1997)

Majbäck is currently the owner and President of Skigo AB which manufactures and distributes the Skigo brand of wax, poles and other skiing products.

Cross-country skiing results
All results are sourced from the International Ski Federation (FIS).

Olympic Games
 1 medal – (1 bronze)

World Championships
 5 medals – (1 gold, 2 silver, 2 bronze)

World Cup

Season standings

Individual podiums
 1 victory
 11 podiums

Team podiums
 6 victories
 13 podiums

References

External links
 
 
 

1964 births
Living people
Swedish male cross-country skiers
Cross-country skiers at the 1988 Winter Olympics
Cross-country skiers at the 1992 Winter Olympics
Cross-country skiers at the 1994 Winter Olympics
Olympic medalists in cross-country skiing
FIS Nordic World Ski Championships medalists in cross-country skiing
Medalists at the 1992 Winter Olympics
Olympic cross-country skiers of Sweden
Olympic bronze medalists for Sweden
People from Kiruna Municipality